North River may refer to:

Canada
North River, Newfoundland and Labrador, a town in Newfoundland
North River, Labrador, Newfoundland and Labrador, a village in Labrador
North River, Nova Scotia, a community in Colchester County
North River (Belmont Lake), Ontario
North River (Ontario), other rivers with the name in Ontario
North River, Prince Edward Island, a community in the town of Cornwall
North River (Gabriel River tributary), Chaudière-Appalaches, Quebec
Rivière du Nord (disambiguation)

China
Bei River, aka North River

Dominica
North River (Dominica)

Netherlands
Noord (river)

New Zealand
North River (New Zealand)

United States
North River (Alabama)
Georgia:
North River (Darien River)
North River (St. Marys River)
North River (Iowa)
Maryland:
North River (Maryland)
Massachusetts:
North River (Deerfield River), in western Massachusetts
North River (Massachusetts Bay), in eastern Massachusetts
North River (Michigan)
North River (Minnesota)
Missouri
North River (Missouri), a stream
North River, Missouri, an unincorporated community
North River (New Hampshire)
New York:
North River (Hudson River), the historical name for the lower Hudson River between New York and New Jersey
North River, New York, a hamlet on the upper Hudson River
North River (North Carolina), a tidal river off of Albemarle Sound
North River (Tennessee)
North Dakota
 North River, North Dakota, a city in Cass County
Virginia:
North River (Slate River), in central Virginia
North River (South Fork Shenandoah River), in northern Virginia
North River (Mobjack Bay), in tidewater Virginia
North River (Washington)
West Virginia:
North River (Cacapon River)

Other uses
North River Steamboat, the first commercially successful paddle-driven steamship, built in 1807

See also
 North (disambiguation)
 North Branch (disambiguation)
North Fork River (disambiguation)